Dezideriu Varga (born May 14, 1939) is a former Romanian ice hockey player. He played for the Romania men's national ice hockey team at the 1964 Winter Olympics in Innsbruck, the 1968 Winter Olympics in Grenoble, and the 1976 Winter Olympics in Innsbruck.

References

1939 births
Living people
Sportspeople from Miercurea Ciuc
Ice hockey players at the 1964 Winter Olympics
Ice hockey players at the 1968 Winter Olympics
Ice hockey players at the 1976 Winter Olympics
Olympic ice hockey players of Romania